Burnsius oileus, the tropical checkered skipper, is a species of skipper (family Hesperiidae). It is found in the United States (Peninsular Florida, the Gulf Coast, and southern Texas), south through the West Indies, Mexico and Central America to Costa Rica. It was transferred to genus Burnsius in 2019, and was previously known as Pyrgus oileus.

The wingspan is 32–38 mm. There are four to five generations throughout the year in southern Texas and Florida.

The larvae feed on several plants in the  family Malvaceae, including Sida rhombifolia, Malva, Althaea rosea, Abutilon and Malvastrum. Adults feed on the nectar of the flowers of Sidas species and small-flowered composites such as shepherd's needles.

Subspecies
Burnsius oileus oileus
Burnsius oileus syrichtus

References

External links
Butterflies and Moths of North America

Pyrgini
Butterflies of the Caribbean
Butterflies of Central America
Butterflies of North America
Hesperiidae of South America
Lepidoptera of Colombia
Butterflies of Jamaica
Butterflies of Trinidad and Tobago
Taxa named by Carl Linnaeus
Butterflies described in 1767